Scott County Courthouse may refer to:

 Scott County Courthouse (Arkansas), Waldron, Arkansas
 Scott County Courthouse (Iowa), Davenport, Iowa
 Scott County Courthouse (Kansas), Scott City, Kansas
 Scott County Courthouse (Kentucky), Georgetown, Kentucky
 Scott County Courthouse (Missouri), Benton, Missouri